The End is an extended play by English rock band Black Sabbath and is their final release as a band. It was released on 20 January 2016. The exclusive, limited-edition CD was only available for purchase at tour dates for their final tour The End Tour. The first half of the album is leftover tracks from the 13 sessions and the second half is live tracks recorded on tour between 2013 and 2014.

Background
The band recorded tracks at Shangri La Studios in Malibu with producer Rick Rubin during the sessions for 13, their nineteenth album. While Sabbath had been planning a follow-up to 13, the album was ultimately scrapped. Guitarist Tony Iommi had written "a whole load of riffs" for the abandoned LP, but "Geezer (Butler) didn't particularly want to do another album", Iommi said of the bassist. Lead singer Ozzy Osbourne also voiced not wanting to record another album, saying "If we were to do an album before the tour, it would take three or four years to complete the album."

Release
The EP was intended to be promoted with The End Tour, being only available for purchase at live dates. Cover art for the disc was created by OBEY founder and artist Shepard Fairey. The End was placed at number 20 on Rolling Stone's top metal albums of 2016.

Track listing

Personnel
Ozzy Osbourne – vocals
Tony Iommi – guitars
Geezer Butler – bass

Additional musicians
Brad Wilk – drums (tracks 1–4)
Tommy Clufetos – drums (tracks 5–8)
Adam Wakeman – keyboards (tracks 5–8)
 Mike Exeter – mixing, mastering

References

External links
 

2016 debut EPs
Albums produced by Rick Rubin
Black Sabbath albums
EPs by English artists
Albums recorded at Shangri-La (recording studio)